Integrin alpha-V is a protein that in humans is encoded by the ITGAV gene.

Function 

ITGAV encodes integrin alpha chain V. Integrins are heterodimeric integral membrane proteins composed of an alpha chain and a beta chain. Alpha V undergoes post-translational cleavage to yield disulfide-linked heavy and light chains, that combine with multiple integrin beta chains to form different integrins. Among the known associating beta chains (beta chains 1,3,5,6, and 8; 'ITGB1', 'ITGB3', 'ITGB5', 'ITGB6', and 'ITGB8'), each can interact with extracellular matrix ligands; the alpha V beta 3 integrin, perhaps the most studied of these, is referred to as the Vitronectin receptor (VNR). In addition to adhesion, many integrins are known to facilitate signal transduction.

Alpha V class integrins
In mammals the integrins that include alpha-V are :

Clinical significance
Overexpression of the ITGAV gene is associated with progression and spread of colorectal cancer, and prostate cancer.

As a drug target
The mAbs intetumumab, and abituzumab target this protein which is found on some tumour cells.

See also 
 Cluster of differentiation

References

Further reading

External links 
 
ITGAV Info with links in the Cell Migration Gateway 

Clusters of differentiation
Integrins